Pseudocnides is a genus of beetles in the family Carabidae, containing the following species:

 Pseudocnides orophilus Mateu & Negre, 1972
 Pseudocnides equatorialis Mateu & Negre, 1972
 Pseudocnides patagonicus (Schweiger, 1959)
 Pseudocnides jacquesi Bonniard De Saludo, 1970
 Pseudocnides monolcus (Putzeys, 1870)
 Pseudocnides rugosifrons (Jeannel, 1920)
 Pseudocnides solieri Jeannel, 1954

References

Trechinae